laryngeal artery may refer to

 Inferior laryngeal artery
 Superior laryngeal artery